Murad Sezer (born 1969) is a Turkish photographer.

Life and work
Sezer was born in Germany and moved to Istanbul as a child.

Sezer has a journalism B.A. from Istanbul University. He built a career as a sports photographer in the Turkish media 10 years before he joined Associated Press in 1996. He was part of Associated Press team that have won the Pulitzer Prize for Breaking News Photography in 2005 with his photo of US Marines praying over a Marine killed while fighting insurgent strongholds in Fallujah (other people from the team were Bilal Hussein, Karim Kadim, Brennan Linsley, Jim MacMillan, Samir Mizban, Khalid Mohammed, John B. Moore, Muhammad Muheisen, Anja Niedringhaus and Mohammed Uraibi).

In April 2009 he joined Reuters News as chief photographer for Turkey.

References 
 LightStalkers
 Pulitzer Prize

1969 births
Living people
Turkish photojournalists
Istanbul University alumni